Andrews may refer to:
Andrews, Levy County, Florida, an unincorporated community and census-designated place
Andrews, Nassau County, Florida, an unincorporated community north of Hilliard, Florida
St. Andrews, Florida, a former city annexed by Panama City
St. Andrews State Park southwest of Panama City